Ranin is a given name and surname. Notable people with the name include:

 Matti Ranin (1926–2013), Finnish actor
 Ranin Akua (born 1961), Nauru politician
 Ranin Salameh (born 1996), Arab-Israeli football player
 Saara Ranin (1898–1992), Finnish actress and director